Asknish is a village in Argyll and Bute, Scotland.

The hamlet is made up of a large detached house (Asknish house) and farm buildings with a lodge and two other dwellings nearby on the A83 road. Asknish House has been a Category B listed building since 1971.

References 

Villages in Argyll and Bute